I Like That Girl (Me gusta esa chica) is a 1973 Argentine film directed by Enrique Carreras and written by Alfonso Paso and Ulises Petit de Murat.

Synopsis 
The son of a remarkable surgeon wants to be a singer and falls in love with a young Bohemian girl.

Cast 
 Palito Ortega ... Dr. Carlos Conesa
 Evangelina Salazar ... Flavia
 Raúl Rossi ... Dr. Conesa padre
 Irma Córdoba ... Margarita de Galíndez
 Fidel Pintos ... Nepo
 Arturo Puig ... Ramón
 María de los Ángeles Medrano ... Alma
 Nya Quesada ... Remedios
 Victoria Berni
 Jacques Arndt
 Edith Boado
    Rodolfo Machado ... Conductor de colectivo

References

External links
 
 https://www.filmaffinity.com/en/film518955.html

1973 films
1970s Spanish-language films
Argentine sex comedy films
1970s Argentine films
Films directed by Enrique Carreras